The United States House Committee on Merchant Marine and Fisheries is a defunct committee of the U.S. House of Representatives.

The Committee on Merchant Marine and Fisheries was created on December 21, 1887, replacing the Select Committee on American Shipbuilding and Shipowning Interests. The House Rules defined its jurisdiction as those matters concerning the United States Merchant Marine. This included all matters relating to transportation by water, the United States Coast Guard, life-saving service, lighthouses, lightships, ocean derelicts, the Coast and Geodetic Survey, the Panama Canal, and fisheries. Legislation referred to the committee also included matters involving seamen (their assignments, wages, treatment, and health) and officers (their titles, conduct, and licensing); the naming, measuring, licensing, and registering of vessels; navigation and related laws; pleasure yachts; collisions at sea, as well as international arrangements to prevent them; coasting districts; maritime schools; and, taxes, fines, and penalties on vessels. The committee has also regulated shipping in the Philippines and Hawaii. As did most committees of the House, the Merchant Marine and Fisheries Committee created subcommittees to handle portions of its jurisdiction.

In 1919 the committee was given jurisdiction over wireless telegraphy and in 1932 its name was changed to the Committee on Merchant Marine, Radio, and Fisheries. After a dispute with the Committee on Interstate and Foreign Commerce, the jurisdiction over radio services was transferred to that committee in 1935 and the term "radio" was dropped from the name of the Merchant Marine and Fisheries Committee.

During his tenure in office, Congressman Mario Biaggi was Chairman of the US House Committee on Merchant Marine and Fisheries Subcommittee on Coast Guard and Navigation.

In 1995, most duties of the committee were transferred to the Committee on Resources and subsequently abolished.

Chairmen

References 

 Records of the Committee on Merchant Marine and Fisheries (1887– 1986), Records of the Judiciary Committee and Related Committees, Guide to the Records of the U.S. House of Representatives at the National Archives, 1789–1989 (Record Group 233), National Archives and Records Administration 

Merchant Marine and Fisheries
1887 establishments in Washington, D.C.
1995 disestablishments in Washington, D.C.